Infanta Maria Ana of Portugal (or of Braganza; ; full name: Maria Ana Fernanda Leopoldina Micaela Rafaela Gabriela Carlota Antónia Júlia Vitória Praxedes Francisca de Assis Gonzaga;) (21 August 1843 – 5 February 1884) was a Portuguese infanta (princess), the eldest surviving daughter of Queen Maria II of Portugal and her King consort, Ferdinand II of Portugal, a member of the House of Braganza.

Life

After her mother's death in 1853, when Maria Anna was just ten-years-old, she became the leading lady of the court, until her eldest brother, Pedro V of Portugal, married Princess Stephanie of Hohenzollern-Sigmaringen in May 1858. Although in the early stages of their acquaintance the two sisters-in-law had a good relationship, in a letter written in 1859 to Albert, Prince Consort, when Stephanie was already dead, King Pedro mentions that his sister made unflattering comments regarding his wife "because of her feminine vanity caused by a lower status (...)". 

The relationship between the sisters-in-law seems to have had its ups and downs since Stephanie's arrival in May 1858 and Maria Anna's wedding in May 1859. The Queen wrote about her sister-in-law: "She is, in every respect, the one who is more like Pedro (...)", "She is a charming person, good, generous, remarkably sensible for her age, with no trace of selfishness, respected and loved by all of us (...) George of Saxony has discovered a true gem. She is happy and loves him, but she cannot talk about the moment in which she will leave her family without crying. What is certain is that she will leave a terrible emptiness behind". Maria Ana's brother, Pedro, also claims during this time that his sister is "the pearl of our family circle", in a letter to Prince Albert.

Marriage
She married in Lisbon at the Belém Palace on 11 May 1859 Prince George of Saxony (1832–1904), second son of King Johann I of Saxony, a kinsman from the Catholic Albertine branch of her father's Wettin dynasty. Queen Stephanie tried to organize a brilliant ceremony, but, in the end, the wedding was quiet and went unnoticed in both Portugal and Saxony. The newly-weds spent their first days as a married couple at Belém Palace. During their short stay in Portugal after the ceremony, Prince George left a poor impression with the Portuguese royal family, as he "barely talked to the bride" and did not attend a theatre performance to which he had been invited. During that same performance, 15-year-old Maria Anna was seen crying. The couple left to Saxony on May 14th. Maria Anna was not allowed to take Portuguese ladies-in-waiting with her and was only accompanied by her brother Luís in the journey. Pedro V wrote the following regarding the wedding: "the wedding of my sister to Prince George of Saxony was celebrated with more pomp than happiness. The former is followed by a regretful fate, as he left no sympathies and people who met him often left with a poor impression."

The marriage was not a happy one, according to Historian Eduardo Nobre who claims that the Prince "did not live up to the expectations and qualities of the Portuguese Infanta". Despite their issues, they had eight children.

Although she renounced her claims to the Portuguese throne when she married, Maria Anna could still become Queen if the male line became extinct. This situation nearly happened in 1861, when King Pedro V and two of her other brothers died from typhoid fever and left no children. However, this hypothesis was completely put aside when her brother King Luís I married Princess Maria Pia of Savoy and had two sons, the future Carlos I and Infante Afonso. Despite everything, it is unlikely that Maria Anna ever gave this hypothesis great importance because of her troubled marriage and many children.   

Around 1883, her youngest son, Prince Albert of Saxony, became seriously ill. Maria Anna took care of him for several months until he recovered. This effort would be fatal, as the Infanta died from exhaustion, on 5 February 1884, before her husband became king. Her husband would remain unmarried for the rest of his life. 

In Portugal, her second brother, Luís I, soon succeeded her eldest brother, Peter V, as king.

Her husband's elder brother Albert succeeded her father-in-law as King of Saxony and gradually it became clear that he and his wife, Carola of Vasa, were not able to have children of their own. Maria Anna's eldest son would almost certain to one day succeed to the throne.

Children

Princess Maria Anna predeceased her father Ferdinand, her husband George, and her brother-in-law King Albert of Saxony. In 1902 George succeeded his childless brother as king, and on his death in 1904 Maria Anna's eldest son became King of Saxony as Frederick Augustus III.

Ancestry

References

External links

1843 births
1884 deaths
People from Lisbon
House of Braganza-Saxe-Coburg and Gotha
Portuguese infantas
Burials at Dresden Cathedral
Portuguese Roman Catholics
Crown Princesses of Saxony
19th-century Portuguese people
19th-century Portuguese women
⚭Infanta Maria Anna of Portugal (1843–1884)
Knights Grand Cross of the Order of the Immaculate Conception of Vila Viçosa
Dames of the Order of Saint Isabel
Daughters of kings